Penelope Dimmock (born 28 December 1954) is a British athlete. She competed in the women's high jump at the 1972 Summer Olympics.

References

1954 births
Living people
Athletes (track and field) at the 1972 Summer Olympics
British female high jumpers
Olympic athletes of Great Britain
Place of birth missing (living people)